Behaving Badly can refer to:

 Behaving Badly (film), 2014 film
 Behaving Badly (horse), a thoroughbred racehorse
 Behaving Badly (TV serial), 1989 television series
 "Behaving Badly", a song by Animals as Leaders from their self-titled debut album, 2009
 misbehaviour

See also
 Bad Behaviour (disambiguation)
 Behave (disambiguation)
 Bad (disambiguation)